Rwanda competed at the 1992 Summer Olympics in Barcelona, Spain. Ten competitors, seven men and three women, took part in eight events in two sports.

Competitors
The following is the list of number of competitors in the Games.

Athletics

Men
Track & road events

Women
Track & road events

Cycling

Road

References

External links
Official Olympic Reports

Nations at the 1992 Summer Olympics
1992 
1992 in Rwanda